"Straight and True" is the fifth episode of the third season of the HBO original series The Wire. The episode was written by Ed Burns from a story by David Simon & Ed Burns and was directed by Dan Attias. It originally aired on October 17, 2004.

Plot
Bubbles and Johnny argue about the morality of acting as paid police informants. Johnny persuades Bubbles to run a short con with him instead of reporting to Greggs. Once Johnny has the money, Bubbles is nowhere to be found. Meanwhile, Carcetti reads a story in the paper about a murdered state's witness and is concerned about the message the killing sends. He takes the issue to Mayor Royce, who promises to act quickly. At a committee hearing, Gray confronts Burrell and Rawls about the witness, while Carcetti urges him to lay off.

At the ComStat meeting, Rawls questions Foerster about Dozerman's missing gun. At Homicide, Bunk canvasses for witnesses in the shootings and is told that Omar was present. Landsman tells Bunk to interrogate some prisoners who have promised to exchange information on the gun in exchange for leniency, but he finds the ordeal to be a waste of time. In the Western, Colvin decides to coerce dealers and crew chiefs into moving their corner operations to Hamsterdam. Despite initially being unable to find any intelligence on the high-level dealers, Colvin gets what he needs when he is put in touch with the Major Case Unit. McNulty arrives and gets a warm greeting from Colvin, his former commander.

Colvin orders his men to bring in drug lieutenants, telling Carver he can sympathize with their position as middle management. Carver and Herc are tasked with bringing in Marlo, but they find him surrounded by soldiers and refusing to move. Carver realizes the danger they are in and has them withdraw. Meanwhile, Officer Anthony Colicchio has picked up Bodie. At Hamsterdam, Colvin tells the lieutenants that they will be allowed to operate freely within the three drug-tolerant zones, but will be arrested if they do business anywhere else. Herc, Carver and Colicchio staff one of the Hamsterdam zones and are tasked with rounding up drug addicts for the dealers, one of whom is Johnny.

Cutty returns to work checking on the dealer that Slim Charles suspects of stealing from the Barksdales. Cutty leaves the crew to meet an appointment with The Deacon, who tells him that he will have to work to find a job but that he can help him get into a GED program. Cutty, having thought Grace would be present, leaves the church. After snorting cocaine with Gerard and Sapper, Cutty is put in touch with an old man who helps him cheat a urine test. When Cutty's crew confronts the girlfriend of the suspected dealer, Cutty slaps her. However, Cutty is appalled when Gerard and Sapper beat the dealer into unconsciousness.

Bell chairs a meeting of the New Day Co-Op in compliance with Robert's Rules of Order. Afterwards, he angrily admonishes Shamrock for taking down notes of the meeting. Later, Shamrock picks up the newly paroled Avon from prison. Bodie reports to a suspicious Bell about what is going on with Hamsterdam. After meeting with Marlo and failing to reach any compromise, Bell attends Avon's welcome party and talks business with Levy, Krawczyk, and Senator Davis. Avon spots Gerard and Sapper coming into the party high and has them thrown out. Bell shows Avon his new apartment, telling him they have enough legitimate money to put whatever they like out in the open under their own names.

In the MCU, Bubbles tells Greggs more about Marlo's organization and names Chris Partlow as his chief bodyguard. He gives Greggs a disposable phone previously used by Fruit. McNulty continues following Bell and approaches him in his copy shop. Bell responds by brazenly offering to sell him a condominium in his development, to which McNulty states his disappointment as he had high hopes for their continuing game of cat and mouse. McNulty tells Prez and Freamon that Bell has become "the bank" - working legitimate businesses to produce funds to buy packages of narcotics for distribution that he will never touch. Greggs tracks down Marlo and finds Bell visiting him at his headquarters. Inside, Bell tries to persuade Marlo to join the Co-Op and is met with silent treatment. After Bell leaves, Marlo tells his people to gather weapons.

While attending an open house event at his sons' school, McNulty encounters D'Agostino doing fundraising work. The two flirt and end up having a one night stand. However, D'Agostino rejects McNulty's further advances after they have sex, turning her full attention immediately to her work. Meanwhile, Omar's crew prepare weapons for their next heist. Tension is still high between Dante and Kimmy over the former's accidental killing of Tosha. Omar warns them that they must get along or leave the crew.

Production

Title reference
The title refers to Cutty's choice between going straight and returning to his old life as a soldier, Stringer's attempts to pose as a legitimate business man, Carcetti's "honest appeal" to Mayor Royce, and Bubbles' aspirations of saving money as a professional informant.

Epigraph

McNulty makes this statement expressing his disappointment at losing a worthy target after approaching Stringer and finding that he is now mostly straight. This also can be applied to Colvin's initial attempts to move the drug dealers into the free zones, as well as Stringer's failure to convince Marlo to join the New Day Co-Op.

Credits

Starring cast
Although credited Deirdre Lovejoy does not appear in this episode.

Guest stars
Callie Thorne as Elena McNulty
Glynn Turman as Mayor Clarence Royce
Isiah Whitlock, Jr. as Senator Clayton "Clay" Davis
Chad L. Coleman as Dennis "Cutty" Wise
Jamie Hector as Marlo Stanfield
Michael Hyatt as Brianna Barksdale
Leo Fitzpatrick as Johnny
Delaney Williams as Sergeant Jay Landsman
Kelli R. Brown as Kimmy
Benjamin Busch as Officer Anthony Colicchio
Robert F. Chew as Proposition Joe
Jay Landsman as Lieutenant Dennis Mello
Ernest Waddell as Dante
Mayo Best as Gerard
Richard Burton as Sean "Shamrock" McGinty
Anwan Glover as Slim Charles
Addison Switzer as Country
Brandan T. Tate as Sapper
Brandy Burre as Theresa D'Agostino
Richard DeAngelis as Colonel Raymond Foerster
Christopher Mann as Councilman Tony Gray
Cleo Reginald Pizana as Chief of Staff Coleman Parker
Michael Salconi as Officer Michael Santangelo
Tony Cordova as Sean McNulty
Michael Kostroff as Maurice Levy
Melvin Williams as The Deacon
Michael Willis as Andy Krawczyk
Eric Ryan as Michael McNulty

Uncredited appearances
R. Emery Bright as Community Relations Sergeant Richardson
Gbenga Akinnagbe as Chris Partlow
Ken Arnold as Auto Crime Lieutenant
Robert Neal Marshall as Comstat Police Major
Lawrence Cameron Steele as Western District Lieutenant
Chester West as Shift Lieutenant Dent
Troj Strickland as Fat Face Rick
Mike D. Anderson as Ghost
Unknown as Kintel Williamson
Unknown as Mee-Maw
Unknown as thieving Barksdale crew chief
Unknown as Uniqua
Unknown as Major George Smith
Unknown as Bruiser
Unknown as Tucky
Unknown as Lil Mikey

First appearances
 Chris Partlow: Ruthless second in command of the Stanfield organization. First appears when Marlo tells him to get ready to go to war with the Barksdales.

References

External links
"Straight and True" at HBO.com

The Wire (season 3) episodes
2004 American television episodes
Television episodes directed by Dan Attias